Joe Maloy (born December 20, 1985) is an American triathlete. Maloy represented the United States in triathlon at the Rio 2016 Summer Olympics.

Maloy was born in Somers Point, New Jersey and grew up in Wildwood Crest, New Jersey, where he attended Wildwood Catholic High School.

Career highlights 
The following list is based upon the Team USA Career highlights.
 2016 World Champion Mixed Relay 
 2016 ITU World Triathlon Yokohama, 11th place
 2016 ITU World Triathlon Gold Coast, 6th place
 2016 Escape from Alcatraz Champion
 2015 USA Triathlon Elite National, 4th place
 2015 Noosa Triathlon Champion (1st American Male or Female to win title)
 2014 Lifetime Fitness Oceanside Champion 
 2014 USA Triathlon Elite National champion
 2014 Cozumel ITU World Cup bronze medalist
 2013 USA Triathlon Elite Nationals silver medal

ITU competitions
The following list is based upon the official ITU rankings and the ITU Athlete's Profile Page.
Unless indicated otherwise, the following events are triathlons (Olympic Distance) and refer to the Elite category.

References

External links
 Official website
 USA Triathlon

1985 births
Living people
American male triathletes
Olympic triathletes of the United States
People from Somers Point, New Jersey
People from Wildwood Crest, New Jersey
Sportspeople from Cape May County, New Jersey
Triathletes at the 2016 Summer Olympics